The Banbai are an Indigenous Australian people of New South Wales.

Language
Baanbai, which R. H. Mathews had treated as a distinct language, appears on closer analysis, according to W. G. Hoddinott, to have been a dialect of Gumbaiŋgar. if not indeed almost identical to the language spoken by that tribe.

Country
They were also present along the Boyd River valley.

People
The Banbai appear to be closely related, as an inland people, to the coastal Gumbaynggirr.

Alternative names
 Ahnbi
 Bahnbi
 Dandi

Source:

Some words
 bodyerra (boy)
 dillanggan (girl)
 ginggēr (kangaroo)
 wandyi. (dog)

Source:

Notes

Citations

Sources

Aboriginal peoples of New South Wales